Tian Yinong (born 18 February 1991) is a Chinese footballer who currently plays for Tianjin Jinmen Tiger  in the Chinese Super League.

Club career
Tian Yinong started his professional football career in 2009 when he was loaned to Liaoning Whowin's satellite team Panjin Mengzun in the China League Two. He joined fellow League Two club Fushun Xinye in 2011. Tian transferred to China League One side Shenyang Shenbei on 20 January 2012. He scored his first goal for Shenyang on 2 June 2012 in a 2–0 home victory against Shaanxi Laochenggen in the 2012 Chinese FA Cup. On 25 October 2014, he scored his first league goal in a 1–1 away draw against Chongqing Lifan. Tian played for amateur club Shenyang City in 2015 after Shenyang Zhongze dissolved and helped the club win promotion to China League Two.

Tian transferred to Chinese Super League newcomer Yanbian Funde on 5 January 2016. However, he couldn't register at the first team in the 2016 season due to transfer quota limits. Tian was promoted to the first team squad in the 2017 season. He made his debut for Yanbian on 5 March 2017 in a 0–0 away draw against Chongqing Lifan. Tian scored his first goal for the club on 2 June 2017 in a 2–1 away win against Guizhou Zhicheng.

On 25 February 2018, Tian transferred to Super League side Jiangsu Suning following Yanbian's relegation.

Career statistics

Honours

Club
Jiangsu Suning
Chinese Super League: 2020

References

External links
 

1991 births
Living people
Chinese footballers
Footballers from Liaoning
People from Chaoyang, Liaoning
Association football defenders
Yanbian Funde F.C. players
Jiangsu F.C. players
Chinese Super League players
China League One players
China League Two players